Hans Zierold (born 16 April 1938) is a retired German swimmer. He competed at the 1956 and 1960 Summer Olympics in three events in total. In 1956 he finished fifth in the 400 m and 4×200 m freestyle events, whereas in 1960 he placed seventh in the 4×200 m relay. On 14 September 1957 he set a new European record in the 200 m butterfly.

In April 1958 he fled from East to West Germany.

References

1938 births
Living people
German male swimmers
East German defectors
German male freestyle swimmers
Olympic swimmers of the United Team of Germany
Swimmers at the 1956 Summer Olympics
Swimmers at the 1960 Summer Olympics
East German emigrants to West Germany
People from Zeitz
Sportspeople from Saxony-Anhalt